Mount Sir John Thompson is a  mountain located at co-ordinates  in the Premier Range of the Cariboo Mountains in the east-central interior of British Columbia, Canada.  The mountain is located between the David and North Canoe Glaciers.

The name honours the fourth Prime Minister of Canada, Sir John Thompson, who died in 1894 while in office. It was one of the first mountains in the Premier Range to be named after a Prime Minister, receiving its designation on September 6, 1927. It was originally named Mount David Thompson by the Carpe-Chamberlin climbing party in 1924, as they apparently believed that the nearby pass was the source of the North Thompson River.

External links

Canadian Mountain Encyclopedia listing for Mount Sir John Thompson
British Columbia Government Information Sheet on Mount Sir John Thompson

Three-thousanders of British Columbia
Cariboo Mountains
Cariboo Land District